Michael Alan Welch (born July 25, 1987) is an American actor. He is best known for the role of Luke Girardi on the television series Joan of Arcadia and for the role of Mike Newton in the films Twilight, New Moon, Eclipse and Breaking Dawn.

Life and career
Welch was born in Los Angeles, California. His father is Protestant and his mother Jewish, and he identifies as Jewish.

Welch is known for his role as the popular Mike Newton in The Twilight Saga film series. Although he auditioned for the part of Edward Cullen, he was cast in the role of Mike Newton. He's also well known for his role as Luke Girardi in the television series Joan of Arcadia, which ran for two seasons (2003–05).

Welch was cast in the series Z Nation on Syfy, which began airing in the fall of 2014. He also appeared in the 2014 film Boy Meets Girl, a romantic comedy which received many awards at LGBT film festivals in the U.S. and internationally.

Awards

 Los Angeles FirstGlance Film Festival (2011) — Won, Festival Award – Best Actor for Unrequited (2010) (Lucky Day Studios)
 FilmOut San Diego (2014) — Won, FilmOut Festival Award – Best Actor for Boy Meets Girl.

Welch is the recipient of two Young Artist Awards. His first was for his performance in the film Star Trek: Insurrection at the age of 10. The second was for his work as Luke Girardi on Joan of Arcadia.

Personal life
Welch married Marissa Lefton in 2008. The couple separated in 2011, and jointly filed for divorce in California on February 14, 2013. He married model Samantha Maggio in 2016. Welch has two children.

Select filmography

References

External links
 
 
 

1987 births
Living people
21st-century American male actors
American male child actors
American male film actors
American male television actors
American male voice actors
Jewish American male actors
Male actors from Los Angeles
People from California
21st-century American Jews